Pit Brandenburger (born 6 August 1995) is a Luxembourgian swimmer. He competed in the men's 200 metre freestyle event at the 2017 World Aquatics Championships. In 2019, he competed in swimming at the Games of the Small States of Europe held in Budva, Montenegro.

References

1995 births
Living people
Luxembourgian male freestyle swimmers
Place of birth missing (living people)
20th-century Luxembourgian people
21st-century Luxembourgian people